Ross Martin (born Martin Rosenblatt, March 22, 1920 – July 3, 1981) was an American radio, voice, stage, film and television actor. Martin was best known for portraying Artemus Gordon on the CBS Western series The Wild Wild West, which aired from 1965 to 1969. He was the voice of Doctor Paul Williams in 1972's Sealab 2020, additional characters in 1973's Butch Cassidy and the Sundance Kids, and additional character voices in 1978's Jana of the Jungle.

Early life
Martin was born to a Polish Jewish family in Gródek, Poland (now Horodok, Ukraine). He and his parents emigrated to New York City when he was an infant. Recorded as Izak and Sara Rosenblat and infant son Marcus, they boarded the steamship New Rochelle at Danzig, which was then a Free City under the League of Nations; the ship sailed on 29 August 1920 and arrived at the Port of New York on 18 September. As they were steerage passengers, they were obliged to go to Ellis Island to undergo U.S. Immigrant Inspection. They settled in The Bronx.  Martin spoke Polish, Yiddish and some Russian before learning English and later added French, Spanish and Italian to his repertoire.

Martin attended City College of New York, where he graduated magna cum laude, then earned a law degree from the National University School of Law (later part of the George Washington University).

Career
Despite academic training in business, instruction, and law, Martin chose a career in acting. He was partners in a comedy team with Bernie West for several years, then appeared on many radio and live TV broadcasts, including playing Wyatt Earp in the January 20, 1952 episode of The Gabby Hayes Show. He made his Broadway debut in Hazel Flagg in 1953.

Martin's first film was the George Pal 1955 production Conquest of Space, followed by a brief but memorable appearance in The Colossus of New York (1958), as the scientist father of Charles Herbert. In 1959, Martin appeared in the episode "Echo" on Alcoa Presents: One Step Beyond. He appeared in two 1959 episodes of David Janssen's crime drama series, Richard Diamond, Private Detective. Soon after, he caught the eye of Blake Edwards, who cast him in a number of widely varied roles; as Sal in the 1959 Peter Gunn episode "The Fuse", his breakout role as the comic sidekick Andamo in the 1959 CBS drama series Mr. Lucky, the asthmatic kidnapper Red Lynch in the 1962 thriller Experiment in Terror, culminating with a role in The Great Race, as the smoothly villainous Baron Rolfe Von Stuppe. He was also a regular on Stump the Stars from 1962-1963.

The Wild Wild West

After his performance in The Great Race, CBS cast Martin in what was to become his most famous role, Secret Service agent Artemus Gordon in The Wild Wild West, opposite Robert Conrad. The Artemus Gordon character was a master gadgeteer and disguise artist, and these attributes fitted Martin perfectly. Martin himself created most of his disguises for the show, and most of the cast had no idea what he would look like until seeing him during the shooting of the episode. The recent DVD release of the first season of the series includes a recently discovered pre-production sketch Martin had made of his very first make-up design for the pilot episode. Another episode revealed another of Martin's talents: he was a concert-trained violinist.

In 1968, Martin broke his leg and then suffered a near-fatal heart attack, forcing The Wild Wild West to replace him with other actors, including Charles Aidman, William Schallert and Alan Hale Jr for nine episodes. He was nominated for an Emmy Award for Outstanding Lead Actor in a Drama Series, for the fourth and final season of The Wild Wild West. The series was cancelled in 1969 in the midst of a national controversy over violence on television.

Later career
After The Wild, Wild West ended, Martin continued his career in various guest roles on television and in roles in television films. In 1970, Martin portrayed Alexander Hamilton in the NBC television special Swing Out, Sweet Land, hosted by John Wayne. He also appeared in a 1970 episode of The Immortal ("White Elephants Don't Grow on Trees"). The following year, Martin tried his hand at directing. He guest starred in the 1971 episode of Columbo entitled "Suitable For Framing", as Dale Kingston, a murderous art critic, and also a 1971 episode of Love, American Style, which he also directed. Martin directed another episode of the series in 1973. Later that same year, he appeared as the famed Asian detective Charlie Chan in The Return of Charlie Chan. He made a guest appearance on Barnaby Jones in 1974, and also lent his voice to an episode of Wait Till Your Father Gets Home later that year.

In 1976, Martin returned to the stage as John Adams in a touring production of the musical 1776. In 1978, he did more voice work for the animated series Jana of the Jungle. He reprised the role of Artemus Gordon in two Wild, Wild West television movies: The Wild Wild West Revisited in 1979 and More Wild Wild West in 1980. He had a four-episode recurring role as kumu mobster Tony Alika on Hawaii Five-O from 1978–79. In 1980, Martin appeared in the third episode of The Love Boat as Tom Thorton. Martin's final role was in the 1983 television movie I Married Wyatt Earp in which he played the role of Jacob Speigler. The film aired two years after his death.

Personal life and death
Martin married his first wife, Muriel Weiss, in 1941. They had one child together, a daughter, Phyllis Rosenblatt (a New York artist). Weiss died from cancer in 1965. (Martin and Weiss were separated at the time of her death.)

In 1967, Martin married Olavee Lucile Parsons (a successful model and documentary director) and adopted her two children, Rebecca (Martin) Schacht and George Martin. Martin and Parsons remained married until Martin's death in 1981. She died in 2002.

On July 3, 1981, Martin suffered a fatal heart attack after a game of tennis at San Vincente Tennis Ranch, San Diego County Club of Ramona, California. He was rushed to the Pomerado Hospital in Poway, California, but was pronounced dead on arrival.

He is interred in Mount Sinai Memorial Park Cemetery in Los Angeles.

TV and filmography

References

External links

Fan site for The Wild Wild West
Biography of Ross Martin at wildwildwest.org
Ross Martin Remembered -- a tribute site

1920 births
1981 deaths
Male actors from New York City
American male film actors
American people of Polish-Jewish descent
American male radio actors
American male stage actors
American male television actors
City College of New York alumni
George Washington University Law School alumni
Jewish American male actors
Polish emigrants to the United States
Male Western (genre) film actors
Burials at Mount Sinai Memorial Park Cemetery
20th-century American male actors
Polish Jews
People from Horodok, Lviv Oblast